Cruelty Without Beauty is the fourth  studio album by Soft Cell. The album was released on 8 October 2002. It is Soft Cell's first album since 1984's This Last Night in Sodom. An expanded and remastered re-issue of the album was released on September the 25th 2020. It included new remixes by Dave Ball, 4 of which were released as a limited white vinyl 12 inch single. The album was also released on vinyl for the first time.

Track listing
All songs written by Marc Almond and David Ball unless otherwise noted.

"Darker Times" (Marc Almond, David Ball, Ingo Vauk)
"Monoculture" 
"Le Grand Guignol"
"The Night" (Bob Gaudio, Al Ruzicka)
"Last Chance"
"Together Alone"
"Desperate"
"Whatever It Takes"
"All Out of Love"
"Sensation Nation"
"Caligula Syndrome"
"On an Up"

Personnel
Soft Cell
 Marc Almond – vocals, backing vocals, arrangement
 Dave Ball – electronic instruments, additional backing vocals
with:
 Dominic Glover – trumpet
 Nicol D. Thomson – trombone
 Mike Smith – saxophone
 Chris Braide – backing vocals
Technical
 Layout – Grace Van Detta 
 Engineer – Ingo Vauk
 Assistant mix engineer – Haicong Guo
 Mastering – Dave Blackman
 Photography – Evelyn
 Producer – Dave Ball, Ingo Vauk
 Programming – Ingo Vauk
 Additional help – Antti Uusimaki, Philip Bagenal

References

2002 albums
Soft Cell albums
Cooking Vinyl albums